New England Baptist Hospital (NEBH) is a 141-bed adult medical-surgical hospital in Boston, Massachusetts specializing in orthopedic care and complex orthopedic procedures. NEBH is an international leader in the treatment of all forms of musculoskeletal disorders and disease.

"The Baptist" (as the hospital is called for short) is located atop Parker Hill in the Mission Hill neighborhood within walking distance of the Longwood Medical and Academic Area.

The hospital is a teaching affiliate of both the University of Massachusetts Medical School and Tufts University School of Medicine. It also conducts teaching programs in collaboration with the Harvard T.H. Chan School of Public Health and the Harvard School of Medicine.

CareGroup, Inc. is the parent non-profit holding company for New England Baptist, Beth Israel Deaconess Medical Center, Beth Israel Deaconess Hospital-Milton, Beth Israel Deaconess Hospital-Needham, and Mount Auburn Hospital.

History 

As indicated by its name, New England Baptist Hospital was established in 1893 by Northern Baptists, a denomination with a long history in New England and an identity distinct from the better-known Southern Baptists.

When the hospital was created in 1893, Parker Hill was a streetcar suburb considered far enough away from downtown Boston to provide fresh air and an escape from the noise and congestion of the city for patients who might benefit from long term rest and relaxation. Parker Hill offers panoramic views of the city, Boston Harbor, and the Blue Hills. Even today it is a remarkably peaceful site considering its location near the center of one of the largest metropolitan areas in North America. In April 2017, New England Baptist Hospital agreed to join with Lahey Health and Beth Israel Deaconess Medical Center.

Bone & Joint Institute 

Through the associated New England Baptist Bone & Joint Institute, the hospital offers a full range of services in orthopedics and rheumatology, occupational medicine and sports medicine, foot and ankle care, joint replacement, spine care, and hand surgery. The institute offers a range of preventive, education, diagnostic, treatment and rehabilitation services.

Sports medicine 
NEBH has a long association with sports medicine and has provided services to U.S. Olympic teams and countless professional athletes.

Boston Red Sox legend Ted Williams came to the Baptist for treatment of a cervical disk disorder in the 1950s. In 1999, esteemed PGA Tour player Jack Nicklaus came to the Baptist for a new hip.

NEBH is the official hospital of the seventeen-time world champion Boston Celtics and has a long association with the Boston Athletic Association which hosts the Boston Marathon. The Baptist continues to provide services to a variety of professional and amateur athletes from around the world.

Notable mentions 

 The American Association of Retired Persons (AARP) named NEBH as one of the top 10 United States hospitals for knee and hip orthopedics.
 U.S. News & World Report selected the Baptist as one of the top 20 orthopedic hospitals in the country.
 Becker's Hospital Review listed NEBH under 60 Hospitals With Great Orthopedic Programs.

External links 
 New England Baptist Hospital
 Our History: New England Baptist Hospital – More Than a Century of Legendary Service.  New England Baptist Hospital website

References

Harvard Medical School
Harvard School of Public Health
Hospitals established in 1893
Hospitals in Boston
Joint disorders
Knee injuries and disorders
Society of New England
Orthopedic organizations
Teaching hospitals in Massachusetts
Tufts University
University of Massachusetts Medical School
Baptist hospitals in the United States